Ana Maruščec (born 31 August 1988, in Zagreb) is a Croatian team handball player who plays for Alcoa FKC in right back position.

Achievements
Croatian Cup:
Winner: 2007

References

1988 births
Living people
Handball players from Zagreb
Croatian female handball players
Expatriate handball players
Croatian expatriate sportspeople in Hungary
Fehérvár KC players
Mediterranean Games competitors for Croatia
Competitors at the 2009 Mediterranean Games